Lonesome Traveller is a song by the Norwegian Hip-Hop group Paperboys. It was featured on the album The Oslo Agreement and is easy recognizable by its banjo-rap and choir in the chorus.

It spent twenty-four weeks in the Norwegian Singles Chart, five of which were at number one.

The lyrics differ from the original Lonesome Traveller (Lee Hays song): Yo every day of my life I've been traveling, Went here, went there, came back again, ...

References 

2009 singles
2009 songs